Cnemisticta is a genus of damselflies in the family Isostictidae. There are at least two described species in Cnemisticta.

Species
These two species belong to the genus Cnemisticta:
 Cnemisticta angustilobata Donnelly, 1993
 Cnemisticta latilobata Donnelly, 1993

References

Further reading

 
 
 

Isostictidae
Articles created by Qbugbot